Bimbilla Senior High School is the only second cycle co-educational institution located in the Nanumba North Municipal District of the northern region of Ghana as of 2018.

History 
The school was established in 1981.

Enrollment 
As of now, Bimbilla Senior High School currently has a population of 1614 students.

Headmasters 

 Mohammed Yakubu Mustapha

References 

Schools in Ghana
Educational institutions established in 1981
1981 establishments in Ghana
Schools in Northern Region (Ghana)